Sony Creative Software is an American software company that develops various media software suites. Sony Creative Software was created in a 2003 deal with Madison-based media company Sonic Foundry in which it acquired its desktop product line, hired roughly 60% of employees, paid $18 million in cash, and took on certain liabilities and obligations.

As announced in May 2016, MAGIX Software GmbH has purchased majority of Sony Creative Software products, including the full Vegas Pro, Movie Studio, Sound Forge Pro, and ACID Pro product lines.

Programs
 Catalyst Production Suite (video editing)
 Catalyst Edit (video editing)
 Catalyst Prepare (video preparation)
 Catalyst Browse (video browsing)

Formerly owned programs 
 Vegas Video (video editing)
 Sony Vegas Movie Studio (video editing), consumer version of Sony Vegas
 Sound Forge (advanced audio editing)
 ACID (loop based music creation), notable for its use of Acid Loops
 SpectraLayers (digital audio editing)

References

External links
 Sony Creative Software's website
 Complete list of software
 About Sony Creative Software

Sony subsidiaries
Sony software
American companies established in 2003
Software companies established in 2003
Software companies of the United States
Companies based in Madison, Wisconsin
2003 establishments in Wisconsin